The second season of the American television series The Mandalorian stars Pedro Pascal as the title character, a bounty hunter trying to return "The Child" to his people, the Jedi. It is part of the Star Wars franchise, set after the events of Return of the Jedi (1983). The season was produced by Lucasfilm, Fairview Entertainment, and Golem Creations, with Jon Favreau serving as showrunner.

Development on a second season of The Mandalorian had begun by July 2019, with Favreau looking to expand the scope of the series and introduce new characters; several characters from previous Star Wars media appear in the season. Filming took place from October 2019 to March 2020, finishing days before the COVID-19 pandemic forced film and television productions to shut down. Post-production was completed remotely, including the recording of composer Ludwig Göransson's score.

The eight-episode season premiered on the streaming service Disney+ on October 30, 2020, and ran until December 18, 2020. A third season was confirmed in December 2020.

Episodes

Cast and characters

Starring
 Pedro Pascal as Din Djarin / The Mandalorian
 Grogu / "The Child"

Recurring co-stars

 Amy Sedaris as Peli Motto
 Temuera Morrison as Boba Fett
 Misty Rosas as the Frog Lady
 Mercedes Varnado as Koska Reeves
 Katee Sackhoff as Bo-Katan Kryze
 Giancarlo Esposito as Moff Gideon
 Gina Carano as Cara Dune
 Omid Abtahi as Dr. Pershing
 Ming-Na Wen as Fennec Shand

Other co-stars

 John Leguizamo as the voice of Gor Koresh
 Timothy Olyphant as Cobb Vanth

 Richard Ayoade as the voice of Q9-0

 Simon Kassianides as Axe Woves
 Titus Welliver as an Imperial Captain

 Carl Weathers as Greef Karga
 Horatio Sanz as a Mythrol

 Michael Biehn as Lang
 Rosario Dawson as Ahsoka Tano
 Diana Lee Inosanto as Morgan Elsbeth

 Bill Burr as Migs Mayfeld

 Mark Hamill as Luke Skywalker

Production

Development
In July 2019, The Mandalorian creator and showrunner Jon Favreau confirmed that there would be a second season of the series. He had already begun writing the new season, and pre-production was underway. It consists of eight episodes. There were fewer start-up costs for the second season, allowing more of the season's budget to be allocated to each episode than has been possible during the first season. Disney CEO Bob Iger announced in February 2020 that the second season would premiere that October.

Rick Famuyiwa was returning as a director by August 2019, but Taika Waititi was not expected to return due to a scheduling conflict with his film Next Goal Wins. A month later, Favreau said he would direct an episode of the second season, after being unable to direct any of the first due to his commitments to The Lion King (2019). At the end of October, Carl Weathers was confirmed to be directing for the season; Favreau had promised that Weathers could direct a second-season episode when hiring the actor to co-star in the first season. Dave Filoni had returned as director for the second season by March 2020. On May 4, Star Wars Day, Robert Rodriguez and Peyton Reed revealed that they had also directed episodes of the second season. Rodriguez was not originally intended to direct in the season, joining as a last-minute replacement. That June, Bryce Dallas Howard revealed that she had also returned to direct an episode of the second season.

Writing
The season begins "very directly" after the end of the first season, with the Mandalorian protecting "The Child" and searching for its home. Favreau said the second season would introduce a larger story, with the episodes being "less isolated" than many of the first season's episodes were, though he said each episode of the second season would still have "its own flavor". He added that the new characters introduced in the second season would come with new storylines, allowing the series to begin to explore stories other than the Mandalorian's. Favreau was inspired by the multiple different storylines of Game of Thrones, an approach that he described as "very appealing to me as an audience member".

Casting
Pedro Pascal stars in the series as The Mandalorian. Also returning from the first season are recurring co-stars Giancarlo Esposito as Moff Gideon and Gina Carano as Cara Dune, in addition to Amy Sedaris as Peli Motto, Carl Weathers as Greef Karga, Horatio Sanz as a Mythrol, Omid Abtahi as Dr. Pershing, Ming-Na Wen as Fennec Shand, and Bill Burr as Migs Mayfeld. Filoni reprises his role as X-Wing pilot Trapper Wolf, while Paul Sun-Hyung Lee portrays the pilot Carson Teva.

In March 2020, Rosario Dawson was reported to be appearing as Ahsoka Tano in the second season. This marks the character's first live-action appearance after previously appearing in the animated series Star Wars: The Clone Wars and Star Wars Rebels and having a voice-only role in the film Star Wars: The Rise of Skywalker (2019); the character was voiced by Ashley Eckstein in these appearances. Dawson had previously expressed interest in taking on the role in live-action after her casting was suggested by a fan in February 2017. Also in March, Michael Biehn joined the cast as Lang, an enforcer. That May, Temuera Morrison was set to reprise his role as Boba Fett in the second season. Morrison portrayed Boba's father Jango Fett in Star Wars: Episode II – Attack of the Clones (2002), and went on to provide the voice of Boba in various Star Wars media. Before Morrison's involvement was confirmed, the character briefly appeared in the first-season episode "Chapter 5: The Gunslinger". Also in May, Katee Sackhoff was revealed to be reprising her role of Bo-Katan Kryze in the second season after previously voicing the character in The Clone Wars and Rebels, and Timothy Olyphant was revealed to be in the season as well. He portrays Cobb Vanth, a character from the Star Wars: Aftermath novels who wears Boba Fett's armor. In September 2020, Mercedes Varnado was revealed to have been cast in the season; she appears as the Mandalorian Koska Reeves, a member of the Nite Owls. In the season finale, the character Luke Skywalker appears along with his droid R2-D2; Mark Hamill reprises his role from the Star Wars films, digitally de-aged to portray a younger version of Skywalker, with Max Lloyd Jones serving as an on-set body double for the character. Additionally, Matthew Wood reprises his role as Bib Fortuna from Star Wars: Episode I – The Phantom Menace (1999).

Filming 
The capabilities of Industrial Light & Magic's StageCraft technology were increased from season one, with the "volume" set also expanded for the season. Filming for the season began on October 7, 2019, once again using the working title Huckleberry. Favreau directed the season premiere. There was "heightened secrecy" surrounding the second season, with actors only receiving scripts for the episodes they were in and being brought to set in hooded cloaks. Additionally, many of the cast and crew were unaware that the Jedi that appears in the final episode of the season would be Luke Skywalker. As he did for the first season, Star Wars creator George Lucas visited the set while Filoni was directing for the second season.

Sam Hargrave served as second unit director for the season. Hargrave said Favreau was "looking for someone... who has experience with action" and that he "wanted to build on" what was done in season one, while bringing in "a new perspective and [taking] it to another level" for season two. Pascal was able to portray the Mandalorian more on set this season than the last, when his other commitments resulted in stunt doubles Brendan Wayne and Lateef Crowder portraying the character at times; Both Wayne and Crowder returned for the season, with Barry Lowin also serving as a double in the season finale. Additional filming took place on location in Simi Valley, California for sequences in "Chapter 14: The Tragedy".

Filming for the season wrapped on March 8, 2020. This was described as "fortuitous" as it was just four days before film and television productions around the world were shut down due to the COVID-19 pandemic. The pandemic still impacted post-production for the season.

Music
Composer Ludwig Göransson was able to take advantage of the emotional attachment that the audience developed with his musical themes during the first season, which gave him the ability to "immediately give them what they want, or play the themes with different harmonies or different instrumentation, and people will instantly recognize it". Göransson uses the series' main theme "in a lot of new and different iterations" in the second season. He explained that the Mandalorian's theme was primarily played on the recorder during the first season to emphasize his "lone man's journey", but was played on guitar in some flashbacks to the character's childhood. In the second season, the theme is primarily played on electric guitar to show the character's new confidence and relationship with Grogu. Göransson uses an Ibanez eight-string electric guitar for this.

Göransson introduces new musical themes for each episode in the season, with new sounds and ideas, as each episode has a different genre, setting, and characters. He uses a "rock 'n' roll, heavy metal mood" in "Chapter 9: The Marshal" as an homage to the music Ennio Morricone wrote for Sergio Leone's Western films. "Chapter 10: The Passenger" prominently features Göransson's theme for Grogu, which he wrote during development on the first season. It is played on a Fender Rhodes electric piano, which Göransson compared to John Williams' use of the glockenspiel and celeste in the Star Wars films to create a "storybook or magical feeling". For Bo-Katan's introduction in "Chapter 11: The Heiress", Göransson used distorted synthesizer sounds to create an industrial sound that matched the character's "speed and energy". His theme for Boba Fett also uses distorted sounds, inspired by sound effects that Rodriguez added to his initial cut of "Chapter 14: The Tragedy". The first season does not feature any references to Williams' original themes, but there were a lot of conversations between Göransson and the producers about how to "flirt with the Star Wars themes a little bit" in the second season, leading to several inclusions: Göransson references Williams' theme for Yoda in "Chapter 13: The Jedi" when that character is mentioned, and he reprises Williams' theme for The Force when Skywalker appears in "Chapter 16: The Rescue". He also uses Kevin Kiner's theme for Ahsoka Tano from Star Wars: The Clone Wars for scenes with that character.

The biggest challenge for the season's post-production team was recording Göransson's orchestral score during the COVID-19 pandemic. The series was one of the first to use the 20th Century Fox scoring stage when it allowed recordings again. Thirty string players were recorded there for the first seven episodes, with the players wearing masks and spaced six feet apart. The final episode increased the string players to forty, while also adding over a dozen brass and woodwind players. To comply with health regulations and musician union rules, the strings were recorded on separate days from the brass and woodwinds. Additional musicians were recorded remotely and combined with the scoring stage recordings, as well as recordings of Göransson playing the guitar, recorder, piano, bass, rock drums, and synthesizers. Recording took place from July to September 2020.

Unlike the first season, where an album of music was released for each episode, Walt Disney Records released the soundtrack for the second season in two volumes: music from "Chapter 9" through "Chapter 12" was released on November 20, 2020, with a second soundtrack for "Chapter 13" through "Chapter 16" released on December 18.

Marketing
The first trailer for the season was released on September 15, 2020, while a special look trailer debuted on October 19, 2020, during Monday Night Football. Merchandise for the season was revealed each Monday from October 26 to December 21, 2020, as part of the "Mando Mondays" initiative.

Release 
The season premiered on the streaming service Disney+ on October 30, 2020.

Reception

Critical response

The review aggregator website Rotten Tomatoes reported an 93% approval rating with an average score of 8.5/10 based on 450 reviews. The site's critical consensus reads: "With fan favorites and fresh faces galore both in front of and behind the camera, The Mandalorians sophomore season solidifies its place as one of Star Warss most engaging and exciting sagas." Metacritic, which uses a weighted average, assigned a score of 76 out of 100 based on 14 critics, indicating "generally favorable reviews".

Audience viewership
The Mandalorian became the first Disney+ show to make an appearance on Nielsen's top 10 list, placing number three in the week of October 26, with a total of 1 billion minutes streamed that week, just behind shows like The Office and The Queen’s Gambit. The show became the most watched program in November, reaching 29% of viewers, beating The Queen’s Gambit at around 20%. In the week of December 14, the show audience increased more and managed to finally reach number 1 in the Nielsen ratings, beating "The Office" with a total of 1.3 billion streams.

Accolades

|-
! scope="row" rowspan="12" style="text-align:center;" | 2021
| rowspan="2"| Critics' Choice Super Awards
| Best Science Fiction/Fantasy Series
| The Mandalorian
| 
| rowspan="2"|  
|-
| Best Actor in a Science Fiction/Fantasy Series
| Pedro Pascal
| 
|-
| Critics' Choice Television Awards
| Best Drama Series
| The Mandalorian
| 
|
|-
| Golden Globe Awards
| Best Television Series – Drama
| The Mandalorian
| 
| 
|-
| Satellite Awards
| Best Television Series – Genre
| The Mandalorian
| 
|
|-
| Screen Actors Guild Awards
| Outstanding Performance by a Stunt Ensemble in a Comedy or Drama Series
| The Mandalorian
| 
| 
|-
| Writers Guild of America Awards
| Drama Series
| Rick Famuyiwa, Jon Favreau and Dave Filoni
| 
| 
|-
| rowspan="5" | Primetime Emmy Awards
| Outstanding Drama Series
| Jon Favreau, Dave Filoni, Kathleen Kennedy and Colin Wilson
| 
| rowspan="5" style="text-align:center;"| 
|-
| Outstanding Supporting Actor in a Drama Series
| Giancarlo Esposito (for "Chapter 16: The Rescue")
| 
|-

| Outstanding Directing for a Drama Series
| Jon Favreau (for "Chapter 9: The Marshal")
| 
|-
| rowspan="2" | Outstanding Writing for a Drama Series
| Dave Filoni (for "Chapter 13: The Jedi")
| 
|-
| Jon Favreau (for "Chapter 16: The Rescue")
| 
|-
! scope="row" rowspan="2" style="text-align:center;" | 2022
| rowspan="2"| Saturn Awards
| Best Science Fiction Series (Streaming)
| The Mandalorian
| 
| rowspan="2" align="center"|
|-
| Guest Performance in a Streaming Series
| Rosario Dawson
|  
|}

Documentary specials
In December 2020, it was announced that a special, Disney Gallery: The Mandalorian – Making of Season Two, would premiere on December 25, 2020. The hour-long special features interviews with the cast and crew of The Mandalorian and behind-the-scenes footage for all eight episodes of season two. A second special, The Making of the Season 2 Finale, was released on August 25, 2021, exploring the process behind featuring a de-aged Hamill in the finale.

Notes

References

External links
 

2020 American television seasons
2